Evars Klešniks (born 18 May 1980) is a Latvian handball player for LiT Tribe Germania and the Latvian national team.

He represented Latvia at the 2020 European Men's Handball Championship.

References

External links

1980 births
Living people
Latvian male handball players
People from Aizkraukle
Expatriate handball players
Latvian expatriate sportspeople in Germany
Handball-Bundesliga players
HSG Wetzlar players